Apocalypse 2012 is a self-released debut EP Album by house producer DJ Trevi. It is one of his most diverse albums, ranging from house to hard dance.

The first single, "Apocalypse 2012", was featured in the documentary Gay Latino Los Angeles: Coming of Age. The hard dance track "Schizophrenia" was featured on the mega series Amsterdam Dance Essentials: Hard Dance, and became one of the most downloaded songs on iTunes for that album.

Track listing

References 

DJ Trevi albums
2012 EPs